Actonians LFC is a women's football team that was founded in 1998 as Chiswick United, changing their name in 2008 to Actonians.  Actonians LFC is based in Acton and currently plays at Rectory Park.

This team competes in the Women's National League Southeast One (Tier 4) and their development teams play in the Greater London League   They have won both a regional league title and league cup double in 2014/15, and in 2018/19 they won the Capital Cup final beating Leyton Orient 1–0.

Actonian LFC is currently linked with Middlesex FA who also support a number of other women's team such as London Bees, QPR Ladies FC, Enfield Town Ladies FC, and Denham Ladies FC.

References

Women's football clubs in England